Tabio is a municipality and town  of Colombia in the department of Cundinamarca. The town was officially founded April 8, 1603, by Diego Gómez de Mena, on grounds that were the property of the native Muisca who inhabited the area. Tabio borders Zipaquirá in the north, Cajicá in the east, Subachoque in the west and Tenjo in the south.

Etymology 
The name Tabio comes from the Chibcha word Teib meaning "dent" or "hole", which refers to its geographical location, next to the mouth of the Río Frío (also called Sinca).

History 
The Muisca occupied the current location of Tabio before the Spanish conquest, and were largely devoted to agriculture. The Muisca tribe comprised two confederations of small tribes, the Hunza of the northern area, whose sovereign was called zaque, and the Bacatá of the southern area, whose sovereign was the zipa, and which included the territory of Tabio.

The natural hot springs in Tabio were famous among the Muisca, and they were said to have a temple there devoted to the Goddess of Waters. Under the Spanish conquest, the native Muisca were expropriated and the area was put under a colonial rule that issued the foundation of Tabio in 1603.

Economy 
Secondary and tertiary economic sectors are relatively underdeveloped in Tabio. Main industrial crops are devoted to floriculture. Potatoes, corn, peas, and carrots are also cultivated.

Tourism 
Tabio is well known for its natural  
hot springs, which are said to have therapeutic properties. It is also known for the annual festival of torbellino, a traditional Andean Colombian dance.

Gallery

References 

Municipalities of Cundinamarca Department
Populated places established in 1603
1603 establishments in the Spanish Empire
Muisca Confederation